Laurent Michel Macquet (born August 11, 1979 in Marcq-en-Barœul, Lille) is a French football midfielder.

External links 

LFP Stats
Francefootball.fr Stats

1979 births
Living people
French footballers
K.S.K. Beveren players
Belgian Pro League players
Grenoble Foot 38 players
A.P.O. Akratitos Ano Liosia players
Expatriate footballers in Greece
Association football midfielders
Super League Greece players
R. Charleroi S.C. players
AS Cannes players
Ligue 1 players
Ligue 2 players
Vannes OC players
ÉFC Fréjus Saint-Raphaël players
Championnat National players